Jacob Ralph Abarbanell (December 6, 1852 – November 9, 1922) was an American lawyer, author, and playwright from New York City.

Early life
Jacob Ralph Abarbanell was born to furrier Rudolph Abarbanell and his wife Rosalia. He married Cornelia L. Eaton, of Jersey City, on June 30, 1892. After graduating from City College in 1872 and Columbia Law in 1874, he practiced in the city.

Literary career
While practicing law, he also wrote stories, articles, magazine serials, and plays throughout his life.

While some work and translations were published under his own name, he also used the pseudonyms 'Ralph Royal' and 'Paul Revere'. His best known works were the books The Model Pair (1881) and The Rector's Secret (1892), and the dramas Countess of Monte Cristo (1902) and The Heart of the People (1909). He also published translations of stories from French and German.

References

1852 births
1922 deaths
American male short story writers
American male dramatists and playwrights
Columbia Law School alumni
City College of New York alumni
American male novelists
19th-century American male writers
19th-century American novelists
19th-century American short story writers
19th-century American dramatists and playwrights
19th-century American lawyers
19th-century American translators
20th-century American novelists
20th-century American male writers
20th-century American short story writers
20th-century American dramatists and playwrights
20th-century American lawyers
20th-century American translators
New York (state) lawyers